Old Age may refer to:

old age

 Old Age (song), song by Hole, originally composed by Kurt Cobain of Nirvana
 Old Age, a painting in the series The Voyage of Life by Thomas Cole
 "Old Age", song by Louis Jordan
 "Old Age", B-side to Let's Party (Rhinoceros song)
 "Old Age", comedy sketch recorded by Phyllis Diller